Arafo is a municipality of the southeastern part of the island of Tenerife in the province of Santa Cruz de Tenerife, on the Canary Islands. The town Arafo is situated 5 km west of the coast town Candelaria and 22 km southwest of Santa Cruz de Tenerife. The TF-1 motorway passes through the eastern part of the municipality.

Historical population

See also

List of municipalities in Santa Cruz de Tenerife

References 

Municipalities in Tenerife